What the Swedish Butler Saw is a 1975 Swedish-American erotic sex comedy film directed by Vernon P. Becker and starring Ole Søltoft, Sue Longhurst, Malou Cartwright and Diana Dors. It is known by several alternative titles including A Man with a Maid, The Groove Room and Champagnegalopp. The film is loosely based on the 1908 erotic novel The Way of a Man with a Maid.

During the 3-D revival of the 1980s, the film was re-released under the title Tickled Pink, but the release did keep the Swedish Butler credit sequence intact.

The film was shot in Stereoscopic 3-D at studios in Stockholm with exteriors in Denmark.

Premise
In Victorian London, a young aristocrat, Jack Armstrong, is desperate to win the love of his beloved, the greedy Lady Alice Faversham. Jack buys an insane asylum to turn into a "love nest", unaware that Jack the Ripper still lives there.

Cast
 Sue Longhurst as Alice Faversham
 Ole Søltoft as Jack Armstrong
 Malou Cartwright as Penny
 Diana Dors as Madame Helena
 Charlie Elvegård as Samson
 Martin Young as Jack the Ripper
 Steven Lund as young Jack
 Joe Grey as Judge Pettibone
 Larry Leonard as Mr. Pendleton
 Peter Rose as Reverend Faversham
 Julie Bernby as Mrs. Faversham
 Barbara Hart as Mrs. Armstrong
 Gil Holmes as Mr. Armstrong
 Tina Monell as Marion Faversham

Production
It was one of a number of sex comedies starring Diana Dors.

See also
 List of American films of 1975

References

External links
 

1975 films
1970s sex comedy films
Swedish sex comedy films
Swedish pornographic films
American pornographic films
Films based on British novels
American sex comedy films
1970s English-language films
English-language Swedish films
Films about prostitution in the United Kingdom
Films set in the 1800s
Films set in the 19th century
Swedish independent films
American independent films
1975 comedy films
1975 independent films
1970s pornographic films
Films set in London
Films shot in Stockholm
Films shot in Denmark
1970s American films
1970s Swedish films